Shehram Sarwar Chaudhary (born 24 April 1965) has been Justice of the Lahore High Court since 8 June 2015.

References 

1968 births
Living people
Judges of the Lahore High Court
Pakistani judges